Pommerenke is the surname of:

Christian Pommerenke (born 1933), Danish mathematician 
David Pommerenke, American engineer
Heinrich Pommerenke (1937–2008), German serial killer
Jürgen Pommerenke (born 1953), German football midfielder and manager
Ethnonymic surnames